Lore Frisch (1925, Schwindegg – 1962, Potsdam) was a German actress.

Selected filmography
 The Blue and White Lion (1952)
 Young Heart Full of Love (1953)
 Marriage Strike (1953)
 52 Weeks Make A Year (1955)
 The Czar and the Carpenter (1956)
 My Wife Makes Music (1958)
 The Dress (1961)

References

External links
 

1925 births
1962 deaths
People from Mühldorf (district)
German film actresses
20th-century German actresses
1962 suicides
Suicides in Germany